André Zoete (born 30 August 1931) is a French wrestler. He competed at the 1956 Summer Olympics, the 1960 Summer Olympics and the 1964 Summer Olympics.

References

1931 births
Living people
French male sport wrestlers
Olympic wrestlers of France
Wrestlers at the 1956 Summer Olympics
Wrestlers at the 1960 Summer Olympics
Wrestlers at the 1964 Summer Olympics
Sportspeople from Lille